Scirpophaga magnella is a moth in the family Crambidae. It was described by Joseph de Joannis in 1930. It is found in China (Zhejiang, Hunan, Guangdong, Hainan, Hong Kong, Guangxi, Sichuan, Yunnan, Xizang), Iran, Afghanistan, Pakistan, India, Nepal, Bangladesh, Myanmar, Thailand and Vietnam.

The wingspan is 25–40 mm for males and 32–49 mm for females. The forewings and hindwings are white, with an ochreous-yellow anal tuft in females.

The larvae feed on Tripidium bengalense (synonyms Saccharum bengalense and Erianthus munja).

References

Moths described in 1930
Schoenobiinae
Moths of Asia